The Ministry of Social Solidarity and Inclusion (MSSI;) is the government department of East Timor accountable for social security and related matters.

Functions
The Ministry is responsible for the design, implementation, coordination and evaluation of policy for the following areas:

 social security;
 social assistance; and
 community reintegration.

Minister
The incumbent Minister of Social Solidarity and Inclusion is Armanda Berta dos Santos, Deputy Prime Minister 
 of East Timor.

See also 
 List of social security ministries
 Politics of East Timor

References

Footnote

Notes

External links

  – official site 

Social Solidarity and Inclusion
East Timor